Melanoplus sanguinipes, known generally as migratory grasshopper, is a species of spur-throated grasshopper in the family Acrididae. Other common names include the lesser migratory grasshopper and red-legged grasshopper. It is found in the Caribbean and North America.

Subspecies
These four subspecies belong to the species Melanoplus sanguinipes:
 Melanoplus sanguinipes atlanis (Riley, 1875) i c g
 Melanoplus sanguinipes defectus Scudder, 1897 i c g
 Melanoplus sanguinipes sanguinipes (Fabricius, 1798) i c g
 Melanoplus sanguinipes vulturnus Gurney and Brooks, 1959 i g
Data sources: i = ITIS, c = Catalogue of Life, g = GBIF, b = Bugguide.net

References

Bugguide.net. Species Melanoplus sanguinipes - Migratory Grasshopper
USDA factsheet. Migratory Grasshopper Melanoplus sanguinipes (Fabricius)

External links

 

Melanoplinae
Articles created by Qbugbot
Insects described in 1798